Sam Wells (November 4, 1950 – June 3, 2011) was an American experimental filmmaker and photographer based in Princeton, New Jersey. He is best known for the film Wired Angel (1999), an avant-garde feature inspired by the life and trial of Joan of Arc. Filmed on high-contrast black-and-white reversal film and featuring a musical score written by Academy Award-winning composer Joe Renzetti, Wired Angel was well received at underground film festivals in both Chicago and New York, with Film Threat magazine naming it one of the best unseen films of 2001.

Wells' 1990 short film The Talking Rain played at the 1991 Sundance Film Festival. He exhibited sections of his Vietnam-inspired film and digital media installation Fragrance of Ghosts at William Paterson University in 2007.

Wells was awarded a Guggenheim Fellowship in 2003. In 2006, he was the recipient of an Artist Fellowship from the New Jersey State Council on the Arts.

Filmography

Early Shorts (1974–1979)
Endymion
Woman of Light
Angels of Winter
Miari Miare Remir
Self Portrait
Crucifixion/Lux in diafana
Landscape
Realm
 The Talking Rain (1990)
 Wired Angel (1999)
 Lucent Membranes (2008–2011)

Installations
Fragrance of Ghosts/Huong (2004–2011)
Kieu
Vinh Long Garden
The Willow Sees The Heron's Image Upside-Down

References

External links
 Sam Wells Official Website
 Wired Angel at the Internet Movie Database
 Review of Wired Angel at Film Threat (Phil Hall)
 The Talking Rain | Archives | Sundance Institute

1950 births
2011 deaths
People from Princeton, New Jersey
American experimental filmmakers
Film directors from New Jersey